Athanasios 'Thanasis' Papatolios (born 14 July 1994) is a Greek professional footballer who plays as a midfielder for Super League 2 club Kalamata.

Honours
OFI
Football League: 2017–18

References

1994 births
Living people
Greek footballers
Super League Greece 2 players
Football League (Greece) players
Pierikos F.C. players
Acharnaikos F.C. players
OFI Crete F.C. players
Panachaiki F.C. players
Association football midfielders
Footballers from Katerini